The women's masters 400 metres at the 2015 World Championships in Athletics was a special demonstration event held at the Beijing National Stadium on 29 August.  All the participants are in the W50 division (older than age 50).

Elizabeth Gail Wilson was the early leader, aggressively running the final turn ahead of Renee Henderson onto the home stretch.  Henderson looked spent and started to drop back.  Sarah Louise Read Cayton was not too far behind Wilson and moved into another gear that Wilson was unable to match.  Clayton continued on to gold.  From far back, Virginia Corinne Mitchell matched her British teammate's speed on the straight, sprinting past Henderson and Wilson for a distant, but solid silver.

Schedule

Results

References

Events at the 2015 World Championships in Athletics
2015 in women's athletics